Rabbi Avishai Chaim David (born 1949) is the Rosh Yeshiva of Yeshivat Torat Shraga (YTS) in Bayit Vegan, Jerusalem, Israel, and the founding rabbi of Beit Medrash Torani Leumi (BMTL) in Beit Shemesh. He is currently the Rabbi of Kehillas Beis Tefillah Yonah Avraham in Ramat Beit Shemesh.

David studied under Rabbi Joseph Soloveitchik for 14 years and received his semicha from Rabbi Isaac Elchanan Theological Seminary (RIETS) at Yeshiva University in New York City. He is a student of Rabbi Avigdor Nevenzahl. He authored "Dorosh Darash Yosef" a sefer on the weekly parsha based on the shiurim of Rav Yosef Dov Soloveitchik.

David lives in Ramat Beit Shemesh, where he is a community-wide posek and the rabbi of a local synagogue catering to American olim. His brother, Rabbi Aharon David, is one of the most prominent Rabbis at the Mir Yeshiva in Jerusalem.

External links
Yeshivat Torat Shraga Website
Kehillas Beis Tefillah Yonah Avraham website

References

1949 births
Living people
Religious Zionist rosh yeshivas
Rabbi Isaac Elchanan Theological Seminary semikhah recipients
Beit Shemesh
Israeli Orthodox rabbis